Excoecaria guineensis is a species of flowering plant in the family Euphorbiaceae. It was originally described as Stillingia guineensis Benth. in 1849. It is native to western and central tropical Africa.

References

guineensis
Plants described in 1849
Flora of Africa